Charles "Specs" Davidson was an American baseball pitcher in the Negro leagues. He played with the Baltimore Elite Giants in 1940 and the New York Black Yankees from 1946 to 1948.

References

External links
 and Seamheads

Baltimore Elite Giants players
New York Black Yankees players
Year of birth missing
Year of death missing
Baseball pitchers